Filip Lakuš (Vižovlje near Veliko Trgovišće, 24 March 1888 – Sesvete, 3 August 1958) was a Croatian and Yugoslavian politician. Lakuš was among the leaders of the 1920 Croatian Peasant Rebellion in and around Križ. He was a member of the Croatian Peasant Party (Hrvatska seljačka stranka, HSS) and the group that split from the party known as the Croatian Republican Peasant Party (Hrvatska republikanska seljačka stranka, HRSS). In 1943, Lakuš joined a faction of the HSS cooperating with the Yugoslav Partisans against the Axis powers following the World War II invasion of Yugoslavia. He was a delegated to the State Anti-fascist Council for the National Liberation of Croatia (Zemaljsko antifašističko vijeće narodnog oslobođenja Hrvatske, ZAVNOH) as well as the Anti-Fascist Council for the National Liberation of Yugoslavia (Antifašističko  vijeće narodnog oslobođenja Jugoslavije, AVNOJ). He was appointed to the presidencies of both ZAVNOH and AVNOJ. In 1945, he was appointed a member and a vice-president of the presidium of the Parliament of the Democratic Federal Yugoslavia and subsequently of the Federal People's Republic of Yugoslavia and a member of the Yugoslav Agrarian Council until retirement in 1952.

References 

1888 births
1958 deaths
People from Veliko Trgovišće
Croatian Peasant Party politicians